Qomchoqay Castle is a historical castle located in Bijar County in Kurdistan Province, The longevity of this fortress dates back to the 3rd millennium BC.

References 

Castles in Iran